Flor Idalba de Almeida is a Venezuelan politician. She was the first mayor elected by direct vote of the Sotillo Municipality (Puerto La Cruz), in the Anzoátegui state, as well as the first woman to be elected to the position.

Career 
She was the first mayor elected by direct vote in the Juan Antonio Sotillo Municipality (Puerto La Cruz), in the Anzoátegui state, as well as the first woman to be elected to the post. She was also president of her city council and one of the founders of the project known as the Mancomunidad de los Desechos Sólidos Urbanos (Masur). After her term as mayor, she has continued to work as a militant of Acción Democrática. De Alemida supported the candidate of the Democratic Unity Roundtable (MUD) for the governorship of Anzoátegui in the 2012 regional elections, Antonio Barreto Sira, being a member of the regional organization "Mujeres por el Progreso" (Women for Progress).

References

External links 

 Cuatro municipios, un destino común - Diario El Tiempo, 19 December 2013
Democratic Action (Venezuela) politicians
Women mayors of places in Venezuela
Venezuelan women in politics
Living people
Year of birth missing (living people)